Bad Family may refer to:

 Bad Family (TV series), a South Korean TV series 
 Bad Family (film), a 2010 Finnish film